Agila-1 or Mabuhay was launched on March 20, 1987, under the name Palapa B2-P in Cape Canaveral Air Force Station. It was originally under Indonesian company, PT Pasifik Satelit Nusantara until it was acquired by Philippine company, Mabuhay Satellite Corporation which is under PLDT in 1996. Upon its acquisition by Mabuhay, it became the first Philippine satellite through acquisition while in orbit. Palapa B2-P was later renamed to "Agila-1", the local name for the  Philippine eagle. The satellite's operation ended in January 1998 and was deorbited.

References

Telecommunications in the Philippines
First artificial satellites of a country
Spacecraft launched in 1987
Satellites of the Philippines
Satellites using the HS-376 bus